Chavelkan or Chavalkan or Chavlakan or Chawalakan, also rendered as Chabalkan or Chabolkan or Chabolakan, may refer to:
 Chavelkan-e Hajji
 Chavelkan-e Vazir